Eupithecia sharronata is a moth in the family Geometridae. It is found in North America, including Alberta, British Columbia, Manitoba, Newfoundland and Labrador and Ontario.

Adults have been recorded on wing from May to August.

The larvae feed on Salix species.

References

Moths described in 1990
sharronata
Moths of North America